UCSF Benioff Children's Hospital is a children's hospital system in San Francisco, California, subordinate to the University of California, San Francisco. It has four campuses: the Parnassus Campus, the Mount Zion Campus, and the Mission Bay Campus, and the Oakland campus.

The organization provides medical services for "virtually all pediatric conditions, including cancer, heart disease, neurological disorders, pulmonology, diabetes and endocrinology, as well as the care of critically ill newborns."

History 
In June 2010, Marc Benioff and his wife Lynne announced a $100 Million Gift to UCSF Children's Hospital with the goal of not only seeing the new hospital built but significantly advancing children's health worldwide.

In 2014, Children's Hospital Oakland affiliated with UCSF Benioff Children's Hospital.

In 2016, the UCSF Children's Hospital was ranked among the top 25 in 8 out of 10 hospital specialties in the U.S News & World Report’s best pediatric hospitals listing.

In 2020, all of UCSF Benioff Children's Hospitals' placed nationally in all 10 ranked pediatric specialties on U.S. News & World Report.

Facilities

UCSF Benioff Children's Hospital San Francisco 
UCSF Benioff Children's Hospital San Francisco is a pediatric acute care hospital located in San Francisco, California. The hospital has 183 beds and 50 bassinets. The hospital is affiliated with the UCSF School of Medicine. The hospital provides comprehensive pediatric specialties and subspecialties to pediatric patients aged 0–21 throughout Northern California and beyond. UCSF Benioff Children's Hospital San Francisco also features a pediatric emergency department.

The hospital hosts a nearby Family House and onsite Ronald McDonald House for families to sleep under the same roof as their child. Additionally, family room with showers, laundry, snack facilities and the presence of staff to assist parents with questions about their child's diagnosis and special services. There is a classroom fully accredited by the San Francisco Unified School District for patients and siblings in grades K-12 for child schooling. The hospital also offers interactive mobile science exhibits designed by San Francisco's Exploratorium that can be wheeled into a patient's room for private playtime.

UCSF Benioff Children's Hospital Oakland 

UCSF Benioff Children's Hospital Oakland formerly known as Children's Hospital Oakland is a pediatric acute care hospital located in Oakland, California. The hospital has 191 beds and is affiliated with the UCSF School of Medicine. The hospital provides comprehensive pediatric specialties and subspecialties to infants, children, teens, and young adults aged 0–21 throughout Northern California. UCSF Benioff Children's Hospital Oakland also features a Level 1 Pediatric Trauma Center, 1 of 5 in the state.

References

External links

 UCSF Benioff Children's Hospital
 Fact Sheet

University of California, San Francisco
Children's hospitals in the United States
Hospitals in San Francisco
Pediatric trauma centers